Tage Åsén (born 1943) is a Swedish graphic artist and painter.

He works in a technique which has been described by art critics as super-realistic or hyper-realistic. The motif in his paintings is a critical "social surrealism" that is predicated on a dark and wry humour. His paintings have been used as covers for a number of books and music albums since his first exhibition (1968).

Most notable among these is perhaps the covers for the Swedish rock group Samla Mammas Manna, ranging from "Måltid" (1972) to "Dear Mamma" (2002).

He also made the book cover paintings of "De heliga geograferna" (1973) and "Guddöttrarna" (1975), the first two novels about Sunne by the Swedish writer Göran Tunström.

2018 Tage Åsén exhibits at Mårbacka.

References

External links
www.brobytornet.se – Official Home page

1943 births
Living people
Swedish artists